Coleen Sexton (born in Westfield, New Jersey) is an American stage actress who made her Broadway debut at age 20 in Frank Wildhorn and Leslie Bricusse's Jekyll & Hyde in 2000. She portrayed the starring role of Lucy Harris in the Broadway production, as an understudy from 1999, and took over the role from Luba Mason in January 2000. She can be seen on the DVD of the show starring Andrea Rivette as Emma Carew and David Hasselhoff in the title role. Before making her debut in Jekyll & Hyde, Sexton was a singer/performer in a Germany-based band called 5NY.

Theatre career
Sexton is mostly known for her portrayal of Lucy Harris in the Broadway production of Jekyll & Hyde, where she was the final actress to play the role. Sexton is the only actress to play Lucy who had been seen with every Jekyll/Hyde, except for the original Robert Cuccioli. When she took over the role, she had performed with Jack Wagner (from January to June '00), Sebastian Bach (from June to October '00), and the show's final actor, David Hasselhoff (from October to January '01). Furthermore, Joseph Mahowald was the alternate until October '00, when the original alternate Rob Evan came back to the show for its final months. In December 2000, camera crews came in to film the show, live from the audience, which starred Sexton, Andrea Rivette, and Hasselhoff, who himself funded the project. It appeared on HBO several times in early 2001, and was released in September 2001. It has since been re-released, in November 2006, but has not seen on television since 2003. Sexton has also toured with the Broadway National touring company of Chicago, from 2004 until 2005.

In 2007, Sexton was the standby for Elphaba on the first North American tour of Wicked. She joined the tour January 3 through October 28, 2007, playing the role in the absence of lead star Victoria Matlock. Her first performance took place in Providence on January 17, when she replaced Matlock mid-show.

Sexton also played Brooke Wyndham in the national tour of Legally Blonde, and the Lady of the Lake in Spamalot at the Gateway Playhouse through July 30, 2011.

In 2012 Sexton returned to the New York stage in the Off-Broadway musical Forever Dusty, about British singer Dusty Springfield. She plays dual roles of "Becky Brixton", Dusty Springfield's manager, and later "Gini", a drug and alcohol counselor. Sexton also understudies the lead role of Dusty Springfield. She played the Springfield role for the first time on February 4, 2013.

In 2018, Sexton joined the touring company of Dear Evan Hansen as a standby for Heidi Hansen, alongside fellow Jekyll & Hyde alum Christiane Noll. As of 2022, Sexton is the principal actor for the role of Heidi Hansen. 

Raised in Westfield, New Jersey, Sexton went into acting after graduating from Westfield High School.

References

Actresses from New Jersey
American musical theatre actresses
American television actresses
Living people
People from Westfield, New Jersey
Westfield High School (New Jersey) alumni
21st-century American women
Year of birth missing (living people)